The Macintosh TV is a personal computer with integrated television capabilities released by Apple Computer in 1993. It was Apple's first attempt at computer-television integration. It shares the external appearance of the Macintosh LC 500 series, but in black. The Macintosh TV is essentially a Performa 520 that can switch its built-in 14" Sony Trinitron CRT from being a computer display to a cable-ready television. It is incapable of showing television in a desktop window, although it can capture still frames to PICT files.

It comes with a small credit card-sized remote control that is also compatible with Sony televisions. It was the first Macintosh to be made in black and comes with a matching black keyboard and mouse. Later Apple would issue a custom black Performa 5420 in markets outside the United States with many of the features of the Mac TV. Apple's similar TV tuner card was a popular option for later LC, Performa series, and select models of Power Macintosh G3 beige computers.

Only 10,000 were made in the model's short time on the market.

Specifications

Source:

 Processor: 32 MHz Motorola 68030 central processing unit
 Bus: 16 MHz
 FPU: none
 Performance: 7.0 MIPS
 RAM: 5 MB from factory (4 MB on motherboard, expandable to 8 MB using a single 100 ns 72-pin SIMM; can use 1 MB or 4 MB SIMM)
 L2 cache: none
 CD-ROM: AppleCD 300i (2x)
 ADB ports for keyboard and mouse
 DIN-8 serial ports on back of computer
 DB-25 SCSI connector on back of computer
 Antenna In (F-type RF Connector)
 Composite Video-In, Stereo Audio Input (RCA-type)
 No expansion slots
 PRAM battery: 3.6 V lithium
 Gestalt ID: 88
 Addressing: 32-bit
 Upgrade path: none

Upgrades
Although there was no official upgrade path provided by Apple, the Macintosh TV chassis is essentially that of the LC 520, and as such supports the same motherboard upgrades. Although the built-in tuner capabilities are lost, installing an LC 575 motherboard is a common method to step up to the significantly faster 68040 processor.

See also
 Apple Interactive Television Box
 Power Macintosh G3 beige 
 Apple TV
 iMac

References

External links

Macintosh TV at EveryMac.com

TV
TV
Computer-related introductions in 1993